Heinrich Burggraf und Graf zu Dohna-Schlobitten (15 October 1882 – 14 September 1944) was a German major general and resistance fighter in the 20 July Plot to assassinate Adolf Hitler at the Wolf's Lair in East Prussia. He was a Knight of Justice of the Order of St John, which was regarded with disfavour by the Nazis.

Early life
Dohna-Schlobitten was born in Waldburg (now Nikolajewka, Russia) near Königsberg, East Prussia, the son of a famous Prussian noble family. He began his career as a professional soldier and was already an ensign (Fahnenjunker) by 1901. In the First World War, he served as a General Staff officer, but had to leave the shrunken army in 1919. He subsequently became a member of the Baltische Landwehr but on ethical grounds he chose to leave the military. Later on he opposed Nazism and found himself active in the Confessing Church's Bruderrat ("brother council") in the old-Prussian Ecclesiastical Province of East Prussia.

World War II
In 1939, Dohna-Schlobitten was remobilized as a General Staff officer and was appointed as Chief of Staff in Defence District I in Königsberg, later to be promoted to Chief of Staff, Army Group Centre. He acted as a corps leader in France, Norway and Finland.

Dohna-Schlobitten's last post was as major general and Chief of the Acting General Command in Danzig (now Gdańsk, Poland), before leaving the Wehrmacht at his own request in 1943. Thereafter, he earned his livelihood from farming in Tolksdorf (now Tołkiny, Poland) in East Prussia.

Dohna-Schlobitten maintained contacts with resistance leader Carl Friedrich Goerdeler, and was soon involved in Helmuth James von Moltke's Kreisau Circle through fellow aristocrat Peter Yorck von Wartenburg. Had the attempt on Hitler's life on 20 July 1944 succeeded, Dohna-Schlobitten was foreseen as East Prussia's new provincial administrator.  The day after Claus Schenk von Stauffenberg's failed assassination attempt with a briefcase bomb, Dohna-Schlobitten was arrested, and on 14 September 1944, he was sentenced to death in Roland Freisler's infamous Nazi Volksgerichtshof (People's Court). He was executed the same day at Plötzensee Prison, along with Nikolaus von Üxküll-Gyllenband, Hermann Josef Wehrle and Michael von Matuschka.

Dohna was married to Maria Agnes née von Borcke, with whom he had a daughter and three sons.

References

Notes 

1882 births
1944 deaths
Military personnel from Königsberg
People from East Prussia
Counts of Germany
German Protestants
Major generals of the German Army (Wehrmacht)
Prussian Army personnel
German Army personnel of World War I
20th-century Freikorps personnel
Protestants in the German Resistance
Executed members of the 20 July plot
People executed by hanging at Plötzensee Prison